Debelo Brdo (Cyrillic: Дебело брдо) is a mountain pass on mountain Povlen in western Serbia, near the city of Valjevo. Through Debelo brdo passes main road of the first state order, which connects Belgrade with Bosnia and Herzegovina.

References

Mountains of Serbia